Elina Kettunen (born 10 April 1981) is a Finnish former competitive figure skater. She is the 1999 Nebelhorn Trophy bronze medalist, the 2004 Finlandia Trophy bronze medalist, a three-time Nordic champion, and the 2001 Finnish national champion. She finished in the top fourteen at seven ISU Championships. Her best result, fifth, came at the 2000 Junior Worlds in Oberstdorf and 2002 Europeans in Lausanne.

Kettunen was selected to represent Finland at the 2002 Winter Olympics in Salt Lake City. She qualified for the final segment by placing 18th in the short program and went on to finish 11th overall (9th in the free).

Programs

Results 
GP: Grand Prix; JGP: Junior Grand Prix

References

External links
 

Finnish female single skaters
1981 births
Figure skaters at the 2002 Winter Olympics
Olympic figure skaters of Finland
Sportspeople from Helsinki
Living people